Patsykiv is a small village located in Kalush Raion of Ivano-Frankivsk Oblast and lies on the Svicha river.  It belongs to Vyhoda settlement hromada, one of the hromadas of Ukraine.

History
The village was a property of Andrzej Żurakowski and until 1772 belonged to Poland. In 1772 it was, together with Galicia, annexed to Austria (until 1918). In 1880 it was inhabited by 436 people. A well-known faience factory existed here from 1912 to 1939 known for its art-déco pottery. From 1919 to 1939 village belonged to Poland, under Soviet occupation 1939–41, then from 1941 to 1944 under German occupation in District Galicia of General Government. In 1944/45 to 1991 it was to the USSR.

Until 18 July 2020, Patsykiv belonged to Dolyna Raion. The raion was abolished in July 2020 as part of the administrative reform of Ukraine, which reduced the number of raions of Ivano-Frankivsk Oblast to six. The area of Dolyna Raion was merged into Kalush Raion.

Geography

Location

Climate
Patsykiv's climate is humid continental (Köppen climate classification Dfb). Cloud coverage averages 70 days per year.

Demographics
 2002: 1200 inhabitants

The population of Patsykiv consist mainly of Ukrainians.

Government
 
Government

Religion
Patsykiv had a significant Jewish population which was wiped out during the Holocaust.  Today, it is a city of one religion - Christian. There are two Christian churches, which represent two Christian groups: The Ukrainian Greek Catholic Church and the Eastern Orthodox Church.

References

Villages in Kalush Raion